The women's 200 metres event at the 2000 Asian Athletics Championships was held in Jakarta, Indonesia on 29–31 August.

Medalists

Results

Heats
Wind:Heat 1: +0.8 m/s, Heat 2: +0.5 m/s, Heat 3: +0.5 m/s

Final
Wind: +0.7 m/s

References

2000 Asian Athletics Championships
200 metres at the Asian Athletics Championships
2000 in women's athletics